The 2015 Abkhazian Cup was the 22nd edition of Abkhazian Cup organized by Football Federation of Abkhazia. The competition was held in the month of May.

Participating teams
This edition of the competition was attended by 10 teams:

FC Afon,
Samurzakan Gal,
FC Gagra,
FC Dinamo Sukhum,
Nart Sukhum
Football Club Yertsakhu Ochamchira
Football Club Spartak Gulripsh
Football Club Shakhtyor Tkuarchal
Football Club Abazg Sukhum
Ritsa FC.

The Abkhazia Cup champion team qualifies for the Abkhazia Super Cup final and face the Abkhazian Premier League champion team.

The final of the Abkhazia Cup took place on October 15, 2015.
The two teams qualified for the grand final match were FC Afon and Ritsa FC. Ritsa FC won by the score of 3x1.

Games by stage

Preliminary round

First Legs
[Jun 28]
Ritsa FC     2-1 Abazg
[Jun 29]
FC Dinamo Sukhum    2-3 Nart Sukhum      

Second Legs
[Jul 2]
Abazg      3-7 Ritsa FC     
[Jul 3]
Nart Sukhum       6-0 FC Dinamo Sukhum

Quarterfinals

First Legs
[Aug 4]
Spartak Gulripsh   0-0 Football Club Yertsakhu Ochamchira 
[Aug 5]
Shakhtyor  3-2 Ritsa FC      
[Aug 6]
Nart Sukhum       0-1 FC Gagra     
[Aug 7?]
FC Afon       3-0 Samurzakan Gal

Second Legs
[Sep 21]
Ritsa FC      9-0 Shakhtyor
[Sep 22]
Samurzakan Gal 0-3 FC Afon       
[Sep 23]
FC Gagra      1-3 Nart Sukhum      
[Sep 24]
Football Club Yertsakhu Ochamchira  0-2 Spartak Gulripsh

Semifinals

First Legs
[Oct 1]
Nart Sukhum      0-0 FC Afon       
[Oct 2]
Ritsa FC      3-1 Spartak Gulripsh    

Second Legs
[Oct 8]
FC Afon      1-0 Nart Sukhum      
[Oct 9]
Spartak Gulripsh    0-1 Ritsa FC

Final
[Oct 15, stadion "Dinamo", Sukhum]

Ritsa FC      3-1 FC Afon

References

Football in Abkhazia